Chu Man Kai (born 17 October 1990) is a Hong Kong para-badminton player. He started playing for Hong Kong in the international competition in 2017. He was unable to grow taller due to a recessive genetic disease. At the 2018 Asian Para Games, he won a gold medal in the singles SS6 event. At the 2020 Summer Paralympics, he won a silver medal in the singles SH6 event.

Achievements

Paralympic Games 
Men's singles SH6

World Championships 
Men's singles

Men’s doubles

Asian Para Games 

Men's singles

BWF Para Badminton World Circuit (4 titles, 3 runners-up) 
The BWF Para Badminton World Circuit – Grade 2, Level 1, 2 and 3 tournaments has been sanctioned by the Badminton World Federation from 2022.

Men's singles

Men's doubles

Doubles

Mixed doubles

International Tournaments (11 titles, 7 runners-up) 
Men's singles

Singles

Men's doubles

Doubles

References

Notes 

1990 births
Living people
Paralympic badminton players of Hong Kong
Badminton players at the 2020 Summer Paralympics
Paralympic medalists in badminton
Medalists at the 2020 Summer Paralympics
Paralympic silver medalists for Hong Kong